Bodybuilding was one of the many sports which was held at the 2002 Asian Games in Busan, South Korea between 3 and 6 October 2002. The competition took place at Busan Citizens' Hall. The competition included only men's events for eight different weight categories. The host national South Korea topped the medal table by winning three gold medals higher than Singapore and Bahrain.

Schedule

Medalists

Medal table

Participating nations
A total of 79 athletes from 20 nations competed in bodybuilding at the 2002 Asian Games:

References

ABBF
Official Website

 
2002 Asian Games events
2002
Asian Games
2002 Asian Games